Cornwallis is a suburb of Sydney, in the state of New South Wales, Australia. It is located in the City of Hawkesbury north-west of Windsor. Cornwallis is bounded in the north and the east by the Hawkesbury River.

Sydney localities
City of Hawkesbury
Hawkesbury River